Tunzi is a rural locality (a selo) in Khvartikuninsky Selsoviet, Gergebilsky District, Republic of Dagestan, Russia. The population was 139 as of 2010. There are 2 streets.

Geography 
Tunzi is located 16 km southwest of Gergebil (the district's administrative centre) by road. Kvarada and Iputa are the nearest rural localities.

References 

Rural localities in Gergebilsky District